Ski Gap is a census-designated place (CDP) in Blair County, Pennsylvania, United States. It was first listed as a CDP prior to the 2020 census. The CDP corresponds to the unincorporated community of Fredericksburg, not to be confused with the Fredericksburg in the eastern part of Blair County.

The Ski Gap CDP is in southwestern Blair County, in the northwest part of Greenfield Township. It sits at the base of the Allegheny Front in the valley of South Poplar Run where it is joined from the north by Carson Run. Spruce Knob, an arm of Blue Knob, the second-highest mountain in Pennsylvania, rises to the south, while  Pine Knob rises to the north.

Ski Gap Road leads southeast down the valley of South Poplar Run  to Claysburg.

References 

Census-designated places in Blair County, Pennsylvania
Census-designated places in Pennsylvania